Billy Engelhart (born March 20, 1942 in Madison, Wisconsin), is a former driver in the CART Championship Car series. He raced in the 1980–81 seasons, with 9 career starts, including the 1980 Indianapolis 500. He finished in the top ten 4 times, with his best finish in 8th position in 1981 at Milwaukee.

External links

1942 births
Living people
Indianapolis 500 drivers
Sportspeople from Madison, Wisconsin
Racing drivers from Wisconsin
Champ Car drivers
USAC Silver Crown Series drivers